Andriivka is an urban-type settlement in Berdiansk Raion of Zaporizhzhia Oblast in Ukraine. It is located on the banks of the Kiltichiia, a tributary of the Obytichna. Andriivka hosts the administration of Andriivka settlement hromada, one of the hromadas of Ukraine. Population:

Economy

Transportation
The settlement is connected by road with Berdiansk, Polohy, and Tokmak.

References

Berdiansk Raion
Berdyansky Uyezd
Urban-type settlements in Berdiansk Raion